St George Hospital is a multispeciality hospital near the Chhatrapati Shivaji Maharaj Terminus (CSMT), in the Fort district of Mumbai. It was also known as the European General Hospital as it initially catered for European patients only.

It is currently part of the Sir JJ Group of Hospitals, Mumbai & comes under the administration of its dean Dr.Pallavi Saple This is a free Hospital run by the Government of Maharashtra with around 460 beds capacity.

The hospital is also associated with the Grant Medical College and both undergraduate and postgraduate students attend clinical attachments at the Hospital.

There is a ward dedicated to seamen in the Hospital.

History

Mumbai's first dedicated Urology Unit was established in St George's Hospital in the early 1960s under the late Dr B J Colabawalla, who was also the founding Secretary of the Urological Society of India. Dr Tilak and Dr Gokarn later joined Dr Colabawala, and the Urology Unit grew to become the premier Urology referral centre in Mumbai, until similar units came up in King Edward Memorial Hospital, under Dr Karanjawala, and in Grant Medical College, under Dr Rao and Dr M H Kamat.

In 1984, the Asthma & Bronchitis Association of India was founded at St. George's pulmonary function laboratory.

References

Hospitals in Mumbai
Year of establishment missing